Mynta is an Indo-Swedish fusion jazz band which uses Indian vocal, African and Latin-American rhythms, Arabic sounds, Swedish Folkmusic and Cuban violin, together with Indian traditional instruments as tabla, kanjira, ghatam and tampura.

It consists of Santiago Jimenez (violin, keyboard), Dallas Smith (Indian flute, soprano saxophone, clarinet), Christian Paulin (electric bass guitar), Fazal Qureshi (tabla, kanjira), Max Åhman (acoustic guitar) and Sebastian Printz (drums). Mynta is Swedish for mint. The band was originally formed in 1979.

History
The group was founded in 1979 as a jazz band by Christian Paulin (bass), and Mynta moved into a jazz-rock & funk band in the early ‘80s. After performing to rave reviews at Jazz Festivals worldwide, they toured India in '87 where they teamed up with Fazal Qureshi and Shankar Mahadevan, to arrive upon their present sound, a new genre they call 'Nordic Ice with Indian Spice'.

Members
 Fazal Qureshi - tabla, kanjira
 Santiago Jimenez - violin
 Dallas Smith - flute, soprano, clarinet, bansuri
 Max Åhman - acoustic guitar
 Christian Paulin - electric bass
 Sebastian Printz - percussion 
Nandkishor Muley-santur, vocal
Shankar Mahadevan - vocal

Discography
 1983: Havanna Club
 1985: Short conversation
 1988: Indian Time
 1991: Hot Madras
 1994: Is It Possible
 1994: Nandu's Dance
 1997: First Summer
 1999: Mynta Live
 2001: Cool Nights
 2003: Teabreak
 2006: Hot Days
 2009: Meetings in India

References

External links
Mynta website
 Mynta at Last.fm
This article is based on a translation of the article Mynta (musikgrupp) from the Swedish Wikipedia.

Indian musical groups
Swedish musical groups
Musical groups established in 1979
World fusion groups